This article details the Salford Red Devils rugby league football club's 2015 season. This is the club's 7th consecutive season in the Super League and their 2nd season using the Salford Red Devils name.

Pre season friendlies

Salford score is first.

Table

2015 fixtures and results

2015 Super League Fixtures

2015 Super 8 Qualifiers

Player appearances
Super League Only

 = Injured

 = Suspended

Challenge Cup

Player appearances
Challenge Cup Games only

2015 squad statistics

 Appearances and points include (Super League, Challenge Cup and Play-offs) as of 27 September 2015.

 = Injured
 = Suspended

2015 transfers in/out

In

† = Matt Groat originally signed a 1-year deal, however, had to cancel it.

Out

References

External links
Salford Red Devils Website
Salford Red Devils - SL Website

Salford Red Devils seasons
Salford Red Devils seasons